Speculative fiction is a category of fiction that, in its broadest sense, encompasses the genres that depart from reality, such as in the context of supernatural, futuristic, and other imaginative realms. This umbrella category includes, but is not limited to, science fiction, fantasy, horror, superhero fiction, alternate history, utopian and dystopian fiction, and supernatural fiction, as well as combinations thereof (for example, science fantasy). The term has been used with a variety of meanings for works of literature.

History

Speculative fiction as a category ranges from ancient works to paradigm-changing and neotraditional works of the 21st century. Characteristics of speculative fiction have been recognized in older works whose authors' intentions, or in the social contexts of the stories they portray, are now known. For example, the ancient Greek dramatist, Euripides, (c. 480–406 BCE) whose play Medea seems to have offended Athenian audiences when he speculated that the titular shamaness Medea killed her own children, as opposed to their being killed by other Corinthians after her departure. Additionally, Euripides' play, Hippolytus, narratively introduced by Aphrodite, Goddess of Love in person, is suspected to have displeased his contemporary audiences, as his portrayal of Phaedra was seen as too lusty.

In historiography, what is now called "speculative fiction" has previously been termed "historical invention", "historical fiction", and other similar names. These terms have been extensively noted in literary criticism of the works of William Shakespeare, such as when he co-locates Athenian Duke Theseus, Amazonian Queen Hippolyta, English fairy Puck, and Roman god Cupid across time and space in the Fairyland of the fictional Merovingian Germanic sovereign Oberon, in A Midsummer Night's Dream.

In mythography the concept of speculative fiction has been termed "mythopoesis", or mythopoeia. This practice involves the creative design and generation of lore and mythology for works of fiction. The term's definition comes from its use by J. R. R. Tolkien, whose novel, The Lord of the Rings, demonstrates a clear application of this process. Themes common in mythopoeia, such as the supernatural, alternate history and sexuality, continue to be explored in works produced within the modern speculative fiction genre.

The creation of speculative fiction in its general sense of hypothetical history, explanation, or ahistorical storytelling, has also been attributed to authors in ostensibly non-fiction modes since as early as Herodotus of Halicarnassus (fl. 5th century BCE), for his Histories, and was already both practiced and edited out by early encyclopedic writers like Sima Qian (c. 145 or 135 BCE–86 BCE), author of Shiji.

These examples highlight the caveat that many works, now regarded as intentional or unintentional speculative fiction, long predated the coining of the genre term; its concept, in its broadest sense, captures both a conscious and unconscious aspect of human psychology in making sense of the world, and responds to it by creating imaginative, inventive, and artistic expressions. Such expressions can contribute to practical societal progress through interpersonal influences, social and cultural movements, scientific research and advances, and the philosophy of science.

In its English-language usage in arts and literature since the mid 20th century, "speculative fiction" as a genre term has often been attributed to Robert A. Heinlein, who first used the term in an editorial in The Saturday Evening Post, 8 February 1947. In the article, Heinlein used "Speculative Fiction" as a synonym for "science fiction"; in a later piece, he explicitly stated that his use of the term did not include fantasy. However, though Heinlein may have come up with the term on his own, there are earlier citations: a piece in Lippincott's Monthly Magazine in 1889 used the term in reference to Edward Bellamy's Looking Backward: 2000–1887 and other works; and one in the May 1900 issue of The Bookman said that John Uri Lloyd's Etidorhpa, The End of the Earth had "created a great deal of discussion among people interested in speculative fiction". A variation on this term is "speculative literature".

The use of "speculative fiction" in the sense of expressing dissatisfaction with traditional or establishment science fiction was popularized in the 1960s and early 1970s by Judith Merril, as well as other writers and editors in connection with the New Wave movement. However, this use of the term fell into disuse around the mid-1970s.

In the 2000s, the term came into wider use as a convenient collective term for a set of genres. However, some writers, such as Margaret Atwood, continue to distinguish "speculative fiction" specifically as a "no Martians" type of science fiction, "about things that really could happen."

The Internet Speculative Fiction Database contains a broad list of different subtypes.

According to publisher statistics, men outnumber women about two to one among English-language speculative fiction writers aiming for professional publication. However, the percentages vary considerably by genre, with women outnumbering men in the fields of urban fantasy, paranormal romance and young adult fiction.

Academic journals which publish essays on speculative fiction include Extrapolation, and Foundation.

Distinguishing science fiction from other speculative fiction
"Speculative fiction" is sometimes abbreviated "spec-fic", "spec fic", "specfic", "S-F", "SF" or "sf". The last three abbreviations, however, are ambiguous as they have long been used to refer to science fiction (which lies within this general range of literature).

The term has been used by some critics and writers dissatisfied with what they consider to be a limitation of science fiction: the need for the story to hold to scientific principles. They argue that "speculative fiction" better defines an expanded, open, imaginative type of fiction than does "genre fiction", and the categories of "fantasy", "mystery", "horror" and "science fiction". Harlan Ellison used the term to avoid being pigeonholed as a writer. Ellison, a fervent proponent of writers embracing more literary and modernist directions, broke out of genre conventions to push the boundaries of speculative fiction. 

The term "suppositional fiction" is sometimes used as a sub-category designating fiction in which characters and stories are constrained by an internally consistent world, but not necessarily one defined by any particular genre.

Genres

See also
 Gender in speculative fiction
 Genre fiction
 List of genres
 Megatext
 Comic genres
 Speculative fiction by writers of color

References

External links

 Internet Speculative Fiction Database
 The SF Page at Project Gutenberg of Australia